Who's Counting? Marilyn Waring on Sex, Lies and Global Economics is a 1995 documentary film on Marilyn Waring, directed by Terre Nash, produced by the National Film Board of Canada, and largely based on Waring's book If Women Counted (1988).

Sequences from the film were shot in Canada, New Zealand, New York City, the Persian Gulf, and the Philippines. The film includes music from Penny Lang, Penguin Café Orchestra, Brian Eno and Daniel Lanois. 
 
The title is a pun on Sex, Lies, and Videotape (1989).

References

External links 
 
Who's Counting? Marilyn Waring on Sex, Lies and Global Economics (full film available online from the National Film Board of Canada)

Documentary films about women
1995 films
1995 documentary films
Films set in New Zealand
Documentary films about economics
Feminist economics
Ecofeminism
National Film Board of Canada documentaries
Anti-capitalism
Documentary films about feminism
1990s English-language films
1990s Canadian films